Diana Mendley Rauner (Born 1961) is an American businesswoman and president of the Ounce of Prevention Fund, a non-profit in Chicago. She is the wife of former Illinois Governor Bruce Rauner. She served as First Lady of Illinois from 2015 to 2019.

Early life
Rauner was born and raised in New York City, where she was the youngest of three children in a Reform Jewish home. She attended Yale University, where she was also a champion fencer. She was All-Ivy First Team in fencing in 1981-82, and 1982-83. She received her MBA from Stanford University, and her PhD in development psychology from the University of Chicago.

First Lady of Illinois (2015-2019)
Rauner is a Democrat, but in 2014 when her husband Bruce Rauner, a Republican, became the Republican nominee for governor of Illinois in the 2014 Illinois gubernatorial election, Rauner appeared in a TV ad for her husband saying "I'm a lifelong Democrat, but enough is enough and the Democratic politicians in Springfield have got to be controlled and I know that is what my husband will do as governor."

On July 18, 2016, Rauner announced a $15 million renovation project for the Illinois Executive Mansion, with the funding being raised privately. The work was planned to be completed by the Illinois bicentennial in 2018.

Other activities
She serves as president of the Ounce of Prevention Fund, an early-learning advocacy organization. In June 2016, The Ounce of Prevention joined a lawsuit fund with other social organizations against her husband, the governor, and various state agencies; the lawsuit demanded payment for services rendered by the agencies, many of which had not received payment for over a year.

References

1961 births
Living people
First Ladies and Gentlemen of Illinois
Illinois Democrats
Women in Illinois politics
American people of Jewish descent
People from New York City
21st-century American women